Alec Bonnett (8 September 1922 – 20 July 1992) was a British sports shooter. Bonnet competed in the skeet event at the 1968 Summer Olympics. He represented England in the skeet, at the 1974 British Commonwealth Games in Christchurch, New Zealand.

References

1922 births
1992 deaths
British male sport shooters
Olympic shooters of Great Britain
Shooters at the 1968 Summer Olympics
Shooters at the 1974 British Commonwealth Games
People from Watton-at-Stone
Commonwealth Games competitors for England
20th-century British people